Box Ankle is an unincorporated community in Monroe County, in the U.S. state of Georgia. A variant name is "Boxankle".

History
According to tradition, Box Ankle was named from an incident when a man fractured his ankle as he fell onto a wooden box in a brawl at a cockfight.

References

Unincorporated communities in Monroe County, Georgia